Bridget (1776–1798) was a British Thoroughbred racehorse who won the inaugural running of the Oaks Stakes in 1779. She was bred and owned by Edward Smith-Stanley, 12th Earl of Derby, for whom she produced five foals as a broodmare.

Background
Bridget was a bay filly bred by Edward Smith-Stanley, 12th Earl of Derby, and foaled in 1776. She was sired by Herod, who was a successful racehorse and important sire. He was champion sire eight times and his progeny included the undefeated Highflyer, Oaks winners Faith and Maid of the Oaks, St. Leger winner Phoenomenon and the triple Craven Stakes winner Woodpecker. Bridget was the first foal of Jemima, a daughter of Snap.

Racing career
Bridget made her first racecourse appearance on 14 May 1779 in the first running of the Oaks Stakes at Epsom Downs. After starting as the 5/2 favourite, she won the race, beating Fame, Lavinia and nine others. At Newmarket in July she won a Sweepstakes of 50 guineas each over the Rowley Mile, beating Fame, Torrent and one other. At Newmarket's First October meeting she started as the 1/2 favourite for a Sweepstakes of 100 guineas each over the two-mile Ditch In course. She won the race, beating four rivals, including Torrent and Transfer. At the Newmarket Craven meeting in 1780 Bridget beat Thunder to win the Post Stakes. In July she beat Whipcord to win half of the Grosvenor's Stakes, after the other half had been given to Imperator to withdraw from the race. Her only other race of 1780 was in October, when she beat Postboy in a match over the two middle miles of the Beacon Course at Newmarket. Bridget started once in 1781, winning a match against General Smith's Girandola.

Stud career
Bridget became a broodmare at the Earl of Derby's stud and produced five foals. They were:

 Guilford colt – a chestnut colt foaled in 1787.
 Hotspur – a chestnut colt sired by Volunteer and foaled in 1789. In 1792 he finished third in the Great Produce Stakes at Newmarket.
 Fair Helen – a bay filly sired by Sir Peter Teazle and foaled in 1792. She ran unplaced in the Oaks as a three-year-old. In March 1796 she won a three-mile Annual Plate at Farndon, before walking over for another the following day.
 Millamant – a chestnut filly sired by Volunteer and foaled in 1793.
 Sir Thomas – a bay colt sired by Sir Peter Teazle and foaled in 1795.

Bridget died in 1798.

Pedigree

Note: b. = Bay, br. = Brown

* Bridget was inbred 4x4 to both Fox and Flying Childers. This means that the stallions appear twice in the fourth generation of her pedigree.

References

1776 racehorse births
1798 racehorse deaths
Racehorses bred in the Kingdom of Great Britain
Racehorses trained in the Kingdom of Great Britain
Thoroughbred family 3
Byerley Turk sire line
Epsom Oaks winners